Globe Pequot is a book publisher and distributor of outdoor recreation and leisure titles that publishes 500 new titles. Globe Pequot was acquired by Morris Communications in 1997. Lyons Press was acquired in 2001. It was sold to Rowman & Littlefield in 2014.

Imprints
Globe Pequot publishes several imprints, including Prometheus Books Lyons Press, FalconGuides, Knack, and Insiders' Guide.

References

External links

Companies based in New Haven County, Connecticut
Morris Communications
Publishing companies of the United States